Pope-Hennessy, or Pope Hennessy, a surname, may refer to:

James Pope-Hennessy, writer
John Pope Hennessy, governor of Hong Kong and later Mauritius 
John Wyndham Pope-Hennessy (1913–1994), art historian
Una Pope-Hennessy, writer, mother of James and the younger John